Honnamana Kere (Honnama Lake) is a lake and holy place in Doddamalthe near the village of Sulimalthe, 6 km away from Somwarpet town of Coorg in the state of Karnataka, India. It is the biggest lake in Kodagu, and once a year, during the Gowri festival, a special pooja is conducted and a 'Bagina' which consists of the belongings of goddess Honamma is presented to the lake.

History
The story Kerege Hara was derived from the building of Honnamana Kere. According to legend, a deity known as Goddess Honnamana sacrificed her life for the welfare of the people. A temple was erected in her honour and modernisation has recently been undertaken to provide improved facilities.

Landscape
Honnamana Kere is surrounded by many mountains, cliffs and coffee plantations.

Places to stay
There are a few Homestays nearby Honnamana Kere. Tropical Rain a Homestay/ Farm Stay is located 1 km from this lake.

Climate
The temperature in Honnamana Kere, like the rest of Coorg district, ranges from 16 to 27 degrees during the year.

See also 
 Somwarpet
 Shanivarsanthe
 Madikeri
 Mangalore
 Virajpet

Notes

External links 
 

Lakes of Karnataka
Geography of Kodagu district
Tourist attractions in Kodagu district